This is a list of people awarded the title Hero of the Soviet Union who were of Kyrgyz ethnicity. It does not include non-Kyrgyz  residents of the Kyrgyz  SSR who were awarded the title.

 Jumash Asanaliev ru
 Dair Asanov
 Kazak Jarkimbaev ru
 Samat Sadykov ru
 Tokubai Taigaraev ru
 Ismailbek Taranchiev
 Mamasaly Teshebaev ru
 Cholponbai Tuleberdiev ru
 Kalynur Usenbekov ru
 Anvarbek Chortekov ru
 Duyshenkul Shopokov ru
 Osman Yakubov ru

References 

 
 Russian Ministry of Defence Database «Подвиг Народа в Великой Отечественной войне 1941—1945 гг.» [Feat of the People in the Great Patriotic War 1941-1945] (in Russian).

Heroes of the Soviet Union lists